This table provides summary of comparison of various flash memory cards, .

Common information 

unless otherwise indicated, all images to scale

Physical details 
Note that a memory card's dimensions are determined while holding the card with contact pins upwards. The length of cards is often greater than their width. Most cards show a directional arrow to aid insertion; such an arrow should be upward.

Speed comparison

Technical details

Consumer details

Compatibility 

The following chart gives details on availability of adapters to put a given card (horizontal) in a given slot or device (vertical). This table does not take into account protocol issues in communicating with the device.

Following labels are used:

 + (native) – A slot is native for such card.
 D (Directly compatible) – A card may be used in such a slot directly, without any adapters. Best possible compatibility.
 M (requires a Mechanical adapter) – Such adapter is only a physical enclosure to fit one card sized into another; all electrical pins are exactly the same.
 EM (requires an Electro-Mechanical adapter) – Such adapter features both physical enclosure and pins re-routing as terminals are sufficiently different. No powered elements in such adapter exists, thus they're very cheap and easy to manufacture and may be supplied as a bonus for every such card.
 E (requires an Electronic adapter enclosure) – These adapters must have components—potentially requiring external power—that transform signals, as well as physical enclosure and pin routing.
 X (requires an eXternal adapter) – Technically the same as E, but such adapter usually consists of 2 parts: a pseudo-card with pin routing and physical enclosure size that perfectly match the target slot and a break-out box (a card reader) that holds a real card. Such adapter is the least comfortable to use.
 XM (requires an eXternal electro-mechanical adapter) – Technically the same as EM, but such adapter usually consists of 2 parts: a pseudo-card with pin routing and physical enclosure size that perfectly match the target slot and a break-out box (a card reader) that holds a real card. Such adapter is the least comfortable to use.
 Empty cell – Card cannot be used in such slot, no single adapter is known to exist. Sometimes a chain of adapters can help (for example, miniSD→CF as miniSD→SD→CF).

References

External links 
 GumstixDocsWiki Frequently Asked Questions: Are SD cards interchangeable with MMC cards?
 Types of Memory Cards
 USB mass storage device class: Mass Storage device class specification 1.4 Date: Feb 19, 2010 — on the site of the USB Implementers Forum.

Memory cards
Solid-state computer storage media

he:השוואת כרטיסי זכרון